The Orson Scott Card bibliography contains a list of works published by Orson Scott Card.

Ender's Game

The Tales of Alvin Maker

The Homecoming Saga

Women of Genesis

Pastwatch series

Mithermages series

Mayflower 
Mayflower was a projected trilogy begun in 1994 by Orson Scott Card and Kathryn H. Kidd, but only one book in the trilogy was published. Kidd died in 2015.

The Worthing series

The Empire series

Pathfinder series

Laddertop series

Side Step series

Micropowers series

Standalone novels

Short story collections

Anthologies edited by Card

Other works

Plays

Non-fiction works

Works based on other media

Books on writing

Columns

Other projects

Pen names
Over the years Orson Scott Card used at least seven pseudonyms. According to Card he used a pseudonym for "Gert Fram" because he already had three other works appearing in the same issue. He used the penname Byron Walley again in various other publications for LDS magazines such as the Friend and the New Era as well as the short story "Middle Woman" in Dragons of Darkness. Card used the names Frederick Bliss and P.Q. Gump when he wrote an overview of Mormon playwrights for the Spring 1976 issue of Sunstone magazine. According to Card he used these pseudonyms because the article included a brief reference to himself and his play "Stone Tables". He used the name Brian Green in the July 1977 fine arts issue of Ensign magazine. He used this name for his short play "The Rag Mission" because he had three other pieces appearing in the same issue.  Card used the name Noam D. Pellume for his short story "Damn Fine Novel" which appeared in the October 1989 issue of The Green Pages.

References

External links
 Detailed bibliography at Card's official website
 The Library of Orson Scott Card
 Orson Scott Card's work at Macmillan.com
 Orson Scott Card's work at Marvel.com
Complete list of sci-fi award wins and nominations by novel
 Orson Scott Card papers, MSS 1756 at L. Tom Perry Special Collections, Brigham Young University. Contains Card's works, writing notes, and letters.

Bibliographies by writer
Bibliographies of American writers
Science fiction bibliographies